Atizoram (CP-80633) is a phosphodiesterase 4 inhibitor.

References

Phosphodiesterase inhibitors